Burundi is one of the poor African countries with heavy burden of both communicable, maternal, neonatal, nutritional, and non-communicable diseases. The burden of communicable diseases generally outweighs the burden of other diseases. Mothers and children are among those most vulnerable to this burden.

Civilians in Burundi have lived through years of conflict due to the civil war, leaving many civilians facing economic crisis. The government has had limited capacity to invest in the health system, so the health infrastructure is poor.

The link between health and poverty is undeniable. Many of Burundians do not have access to primary health care. Yet the Human Rights Measurement Initiative finds that Burundi is fulfilling what it should be for the right to health based on income levels.

Burundi had the lowest consumption of antibiotics of any country in the world in 2015 with a rate of 4.4 defined daily doses per 1,000 inhabitants per day.

Health status 
As of 2019, the average life expectancy in Burundi is estimated at 62 years, up from 49 years in 2000.

Life expectancy in Burundi

Disability adjusted life years (DALYs)
As of 2019, the top five causes of DALYs per 100,000 population in Burundi for both sexes, all ages, were maternal and neonatal diseases, respiratory infections and tuberculosis, enteric infections, neglected tropical diseases (NTDs) and malaria, and "other non-communicable" diseases.

Child mortality (under 5 years) 
The under-5 mortality rate in Burundi is 1.6 times higher than that WHO has estimated for African region. As this list illustrates maternal and neonatal disorders are the first causes of DALYs but the deaths rate of that decreased from 100 deaths per 1000 live birth by the year 1996 to 80 deaths in 2016.

These deaths have various causes but they have not been measured directly about each age group and gender, while a research has shown that there are 3 main reasons for under 5 years children hospitalization. About 93% of all 1 to 59 months old children hospitalized were hospitalized due to malaria, lung disease, or acute diarrhea. The malaria ratio was about 63%; this is why malaria is the main cause of death and hospitalization among under five children in Burundi.

Various causes are playing a role in reducing under-5 mortality rate. The government implemented a pilot program to increase deliveries in hospitals and reclaim the quality of antenatal care. Experienced nurses and skilled birth attendants can prevent maternal and neonatal deaths. Between the years 2004 and 2008 the proportion of children who delivered in health facilities by qualified staffs increased from 76% to 94%.

Health policies

Abortion 
Abortion in Burundi is only legal if the abortion will save the woman's life or if the pregnancy gravely endangers the woman's physical, or potentially mental, health. In Burundi, two certified physicians must agree that the pregnancy is threatened before providing medical assistance. Even in cases in which a practitioner has deemed that the pregnancy has endangered the woman, both the physician and woman may be subject to prison time and fines.

Hospitals 
There are 3 regional hospitals, 15 provincial hospitals, 33 district hospitals, and 509 health centers in Burundi. Notable hospitals include:
Bumerec Hospital
Bururi Hospital in Bururi Province
Clinic Prince Louis Rwagasore
Gitega Hospital (Gitega province, central Burundi)
Karuzi Hospital
KIRA Hospital
Matana Hospitals in Bururi Province
Muramvya Hospital (Muramvya province, central Burundi)
Muyinga Hospital
Ngozi Hospital (Ngozi Province, northern Burundi)
Polyclinic Central
Prince Louis Rwagasore Clinic in Bujumbura
Prince Regent Charles Hospital in Bujumbura, established in 1949
Roi Khaled Hospital (the Centre Hospitalo-Universitaire de Kamenge) in Bujumbura
Rumonge in Bururi Province

See also 
 COVID-19 pandemic in Burundi

References

External links
 The State of the World's Midwifery – Burundi Country Profile

 
Burundi